John Pakington may refer to:
Sir John Pakington (died 1551), Chirographer of the Court of Common Pleas
Sir John Pakington (died 1625), English courtier
Sir John Pakington, 1st Baronet (1600–1624), son of the above
Sir John Pakington, 2nd Baronet (c. 1621 – 1680), English politician
Sir John Pakington, 3rd Baronet (c. 1649 – 1688), English politician
Sir John Pakington, 4th Baronet (1671–1727), English politician
Sir John Pakington, 6th Baronet (c. 1722 – 1762) of the Pakington baronets
Sir John Pakington, 8th Baronet (1760–1830) of the Pakington baronets
John Pakington, 1st Baron Hampton (1799–1880), English politician

See also
Pakington Baronets and Baron Hampton